Saddle soap is a compound used for cleaning, conditioning, and protecting leather.  It typically contains mild soap, softening ingredients such as lanolin, and preservatives such as beeswax. It is commonly used on leather footwear,  saddles, and other items of horse tack, hence its name.

See also
Dubbin
Neatsfoot oil
Mink oil
Shoe polish

Cleaning products
Saddles
Leather